Julia Gosling (born February 21, 2001) is a Canadian women's ice hockey player for the St. Lawrence Saints women's ice hockey program. In May 2021, she was one of 28 players invited to Hockey Canada's Centralization Camp, which represents the selection process for the Canadian women's team that shall compete in Ice hockey at the 2022 Winter Olympics.

Playing career

International
Gosling has recorded 11 appearances for the Canada women's national under-18 ice hockey team, accumulating five goals and three assists for a total of eight points. Having appeared for Canada at the IIHF U18 Women's World Championships in 2018 and 2019, Gosling has captured bronze (2018) and gold (2019) medals.

References

2001 births
Living people
Canadian women's ice hockey players
Ice hockey people from Ontario
Sportspeople from London, Ontario
St. Lawrence Saints women's ice hockey players